The Be Here Now World Tour was a world concert tour by English rock band Oasis in support of their third album Be Here Now.  The tour, which spanned the UK, Europe, North America, Asia, Oceania, and Latin America, included 85 shows over a period of several months in 1997 and 1998.  The tour started on 14 June 1997 in support of U2 at the KROQ Weenie Roast in Irvine, California, United States, and ended on 25 March 1998 at the Sports Palace in Mexico City, Mexico.  With most shows being played during the autumn and winter months, a majority of the concerts were staged at indoor arenas and halls, in contrast to the larger outdoor venues typically featured on Oasis' summer tours.

Many performances were audio recorded by either broadcast media or concert attendees and have since been made available on various file-sharing outlets and fan web sites. A handful of performances were also carried by various television outlets throughout the world, including the 14 December concert at the G-Mex in Manchester, England.

Fueled partly by worldwide stardom and drug use, the tour and corresponding album became "infamous" for the amount of excess and spectacle they provided.  Accordingly, they marked the end of the cocaine era for Noel Gallagher. He would later say about the craziness and wild year on tour: "I kid you not, there was a sound guy who quit because there was too much 'food'...and I thought 'sure it's not the fucking coke you've been taking'".

As the tour came to an end, the album's reception had changed from rave and outstandingly positive to less-than satisfied and below average reviews with many critics restating that it was weak in comparison to the group's first two records. They did, however, manage to maintain a large cult following in many countries such as Argentina, Brazil, Peru, Russia, Italy, Spain, South Korea and Japan where their public persona would strengthen even more over the subsequent decade.

Stage setup
Oasis had a unique album-themed stage set up for the tour, featuring props and set pieces for the first time in their career.  At various points on the tour, stage items included a Rolls-Royce rigged with stage lights, an oversized telephone box, and other items from the Be Here Now album cover.

At the start of many performances, a man outfitted with a tailor suit and top hat would appear onstage to excite the crowd, beckoning them to scream and clap, while the opening piano loop for the song "Be Here Now" began playing over the concert PA.  The band then entered onto the stage through a large door in the prop telephone box, which doubled as an entryway to backstage.  As the tour progressed, different shows featured varying types and numbers of set pieces, though the "Be Here Now" introduction remained a constant through the duration of performances.

Set list
This set list is representative of the performance on 14 December 1997 at GMEX Arena in Manchester. It does not represent the set list at all concerts for the duration of the tour.

"Be Here Now"
"Stay Young"
"Stand by Me"
"Supersonic"
"Some Might Say"
"Roll with It"
"D'You Know What I Mean?"
"Don't Look Back in Anger"
"Don't Go Away
"Wonderwall"
"Live Forever"
"It's Gettin' Better (Man!!)"
"All Around The World"
"Fade In-Out"
"Champagne Supernova"
"Cigarettes & Alcohol"
"Acquiesce"

Other songs performed:
"Morning Glory"
"Cast No Shadow"
"Magic Pie"
"My Big Mouth"
"The Girl In A Dirty Shirt"
"Heroes"
"Whatever"
"To Be Someone"
"Talk Tonight"
"Slide Away"
"Help!"
"Setting Sun"
"I Am The Walrus"

Tour dates

References

Oasis (band) concert tours
1997 concert tours
1998 concert tours